The 1927–28  Hong Kong First Division League season was the 20th since its establishment.

Overview
Chinese Athletic Association won the title.

References
RSSSF

1927–28 domestic association football leagues
Hong Kong First Division League seasons
Hong Kong
Hong Kong
1927 in Hong Kong
1928 in Hong Kong